Hallulla (from the ) is a popular bread in Chile and Bolivia. The hallulla is a flat round bread baked with vegetable (but sometimes also animal) shortening and is used for several traditional sandwiches.

The traditional recipe includes wheat flour, yeast, sugar, salt, vegetable shortening, milk and water.

See also 
 Elevenses

Breads
Bolivian cuisine
Chilean breads
Wheat breads

References